Chamberlain is an unincorporated village in the town of Bristol, Lincoln County, Maine, United States. Chamberlain has a post office with ZIP code 04541, which opened on September 30, 1905.

Notable residents 

 Albinas Elskus, Lithuanian-born stained glass artist

References

Villages in Lincoln County, Maine
Villages in Maine